Slava Kalistratovich Metreveli (30 May 1936 – 7 January 1998) was a Soviet and Georgian football player and manager.

Metreveli played most of his career for Torpedo Moscow (1956–1962) and Dinamo Tbilisi (1963–1971).

International career
Metreveli played for Soviet Union national team (48 matches/10 goals) and was a participant at the 1962 FIFA World Cup, 1966 FIFA World Cup, 1970 FIFA World Cup, and at the 1960 European Nations' Cup, where the Soviet Union won the gold medal. In the latter, Metreveli scored in the final against Yugoslavia as they won 2–1.

Honours
Torpedo Moscow
 Soviet Top League: 1960
 Soviet Cup: 1959–60

Dinamo Tbilisi
 Soviet Top League: 1964

Soviet Union
 UEFA European Football Championship: 1960

Individual
UEFA European Championship Team of the Tournament: 1960,

References

External links 

 RussiaTeam biography 
 Weltfussball 

1936 births
Sportspeople from Sochi
1998 deaths
Footballers from Georgia (country)
Soviet footballers
Soviet Top League players
FC Torpedo Moscow players
FC Dinamo Tbilisi players
1962 FIFA World Cup players
1966 FIFA World Cup players
1970 FIFA World Cup players
1960 European Nations' Cup players
UEFA European Championship-winning players
Soviet Union international footballers
Association football forwards
Soviet football managers
Football managers from Georgia (country)
Burials in Georgia (country)
FC Torpedo NN Nizhny Novgorod players